Bernardo Vilar Estevão Jerônimo (born 12 February 1998) is a Brazilian footballer who plays as a centre back for Allsvenskan club IFK Värnamo.

References

External links 
 
 Bernardo Vilar at Playmaker Stats
 Bernardo Vilar at IFK Göteborg Database

1998 births
Living people
Footballers from Belo Horizonte
Brazilian footballers
Association football defenders
Esporte Clube Bahia players
Clube Atlético Votuporanguense players
IFK Värnamo players
IFK Göteborg players
Superettan players
Allsvenskan players
Brazilian expatriate footballers
Expatriate footballers in Sweden
Brazilian expatriate sportspeople in Sweden